Hönow is a Berlin U-Bahn station and the eastern terminus of the  line. Located at the borders of the Berliner ward of Hellersdorf, the station borders Hönow, a village of the Hoppegarten municipality in the state of Brandenburg.

History
The station opened with the last extension of the U5 on 1 July 1989. The station was in Hönow, and the area around the station was incorporated into Berlin during German reunification on 3 October 1990.

Gallery

References

External links

U5 (Berlin U-Bahn) stations
Railway stations in Germany opened in 1989
Buildings and structures in Marzahn-Hellersdorf
Buildings and structures in Märkisch-Oderland
1989 establishments in East Germany